Manganese stearate is a metal-organic compound, a salt of manganese and stearic acid with the chemical formula . The compound is classified as a metallic soap, i.e. a metal derivative of a fatty acid.

Synthesis
Manganese stearate is synthesized by the reaction of stearic acid with sodium hydroxide, followed by reacting with manganese chloride.

Also, the reaction of manganese(II) acetate with stearic acid.

Physical properties
The compound forms pale pink powder.

Insoluble in water.

Uses
The compound is used in organic synthesis reactions.

Also as an oxidant additive for oxo-biodegradable polymers (for example, high-density polyethylene).

References

Stearates
Manganese compounds